Astralium asteriscum is a species of sea snail, a marine gastropod mollusk in the family Turbinidae, the turban snails.

Description
The size of the shell varies between 30 mm and 65 mm.

Distribution
This marine species occurs off New Caledonia.

References

External links
 To World Register of Marine Species
 

asteriscum
Gastropods described in 1843